ShorePoint Health Venice was a private 312-bed health care facility located in Venice, Florida.

History
The hospital opened on December 3, 1951, as South Sarasota County Memorial Hospital with a capacity of 14 beds. After its dedication, the hospital was renamed to Venice Memorial Hospital in February 1952. The hospital was put up for sale in 1995 after the board of directors determined it would be in debt if it continued operations. The board of directors decided to sell the hospital to Bon Secours Sisters in 1995. Then, Bon Secours sold the hospital to Health Management Associates (HMA) in August 2004. Community Health Systems has been the hospital's owner since the company acquired HMA in April 2014.

The hospital was renamed ShorePoint Health Venice in November 2021.

The hospital ceased emergency services on August 29, 2022, and ceased all services on September 22, 2022. No WARN-compliant notice was provided to employees. Community Health Systems blamed new completion from Sarasota Memorial Health Care's facility in Osprey for the closure, even though it  abandoned plans in November 2020 to construct a new hospital facility in unincorporated Sarasota County.

References

Hospitals in Florida
1951 establishments in Florida
Hospital buildings completed in 1951
Buildings and structures in Sarasota County, Florida
2022 disestablishments in Florida